Trincheras is a town in Trincheras Municipality, in the north-west of the Mexican state of Sonora. It was founded in 1775 by Bernardo de Urrea. The municipal area is 3,764.26 km2. and the population in 2000 was 1,788.  The main economic activities are cattle raising (21,000 head in 2000) and subsistence farming.

American Indian architecture 
Trincheras was named for El Cerro de Trincheras, a nearby archaeological site. This site is also the namesake of a distinctive type of archaeological site found in the desert basins of the southwest United States and northwest Mexico.  Remains of hillside terraces and walls reminded early explorers of trincheras, the Spanish term for entrenchments or fortifications.

Notes

External links
Trincheras, Ayuntamiento Digital (Official Website of Trincheras, Sonora)
Trincheras, Sonora (Enciclopedia de los Municipios de México)

Populated places in Sonora
Dwellings of the Pueblo peoples